The following article is a summary of the 2011 football season in Kenya, the 48th competitive season in its history.

Domestic leagues

Promotion and relegation

Promoted to Premier League
 Bandari
 Congo JMJ United

Relegated from Premier League
 Mahakama
 Red Berets

Premier League

The 2011 Kenyan Premier League began on 26 February 2011 and ended on 26 November 2011.

Nationwide League

The 2011 Kenyan Nationwide League began on 13 March 2011 and ended on 27 November 2011.

Muhoroni Youth's promotion was heavily questioned, as the KFF Nationwide League season was inconclusive. Former KFF chairman Mohamed Hatimy said that Muhoroni Youth's promotion was unconstitutional as the league they played in was "unknown" and that there was only one Nationwide League; that run by the FKL and any promoted teams should have come from the FKL Nationwide League.

FKL Nationwide League

KFF Nationwide League

Domestic cups

FKL Cup
Gor Mahia defeated previous winners Sofapaka 1–0 in the final for their ninth ever title.

Super Cup

The 2011 Kenyan Super Cup match was played on 20 February 2011 between Ulinzi Stars, the 2010 Kenyan Premier League winners, and Sofapaka, the 2010 FKL Cup champions. The latter won 1–0 at full-time.

Top 8 Cup

The 2011 KPL Top 8 Cup began on 9 March 2011 and ended on 25 June 2011, with Ulinzi Stars beating Western Stima 2–1 in the final.

International club competitions

Champions League

The 2011 CAF Champions League began on 28 January 2011 and concluded on 13 November 2011. Ulinzi Stars qualified for participation in the tournament as 2010 Kenyan Premier League champions. They were beaten on aggregate in the preliminary round by Zamalek, who advanced to the first round.

Confederation Cup

The 2011 CAF Confederation Cup began on 28 January 2011 and concluded on 4 December 2011. Sofapaka qualified for participation in the tournament as 2010 FKL Cup champions. They defeated AS Aviação on aggregate in the preliminary round and advanced to the first round, where they defeated Ismaily on aggregate to advance to the second round. There they beat Saint Eloi Lupopo on away goals rule to progress into the play-off round, in which they were defeated by Club Africain on aggregate and failed to advance to the group stage.

Kagame Interclub Cup

The 2011 Kagame Interclub Cup began on 25 June 2011 and ended on 10 July 2011. Ulinzi Stars were invited to represent Kenya in the tournament as 2010 Kenyan Premier League champions. They advanced through the group stage but were knocked out in the quarter-finals by Al-Merreikh.

National team

World Cup qualification
The national team participated in the first round of World Cup qualifications in Africa. They beat Seychelles 7–0 on aggregate to advance to the second round.

Africa Cup of Nations qualification

The national team participated in the qualification phase of the 2012 Africa Cup of Nations. They finished third in their group and missed out on the final tournament.

CECAFA Cup
The team participated in the 2011 CECAFA Cup held in Dar es Salaam, Tanzania. They finished third in their group, but, though having the same points as Tanzania, were knocked out on goal difference through the comparison of third-placed teams in the group stage.

Ranking of third-placed teams

Nile Basin tournament
Kenya took part in the 2011 Nile Basin Tournament, organised by the Egyptian Football Association. The team finished second in its group and advanced to the quarter-finals, where they were beaten 5–1 by Egypt, and later 1–0 by Congo DR in the third place playoff.

Group stage

Quarter-finals

Third place playoff

Other matches
The following is a list of all other matches played by Kenya in 2011.

References

External links
Kenyan Premier League
Futaa – Kenyan Football Portal
KenyaFootball
Orange CAN 2012
2014 FIFA World Cup qualifiers – Africa
FIFA.com – Kenya fixtures and results